The 1995–96 National Football League, known for sponsorship reasons as the Church & General National Football League, was the 65th staging of the National Football League (NFL), an annual Gaelic football tournament for the Gaelic Athletic Association county teams of Ireland.

Derry defeated Donegal in the final for the second year in a row.

Format 
The teams are in four divisions, three of 8 teams and one of 9. Each team plays all the other teams in its division once: either home or away. Teams earn 2 points for a win and 1 for a draw. The top two teams in Divisions 2, 3 and 4 are promoted, while the bottom two teams in Divisions 1, 2 and 3 are relegated.

Eight teams contest the NFL quarter-finals:
The top 4 teams in Division 1
The top 2 teams in Division 2
The first-placed team in Division 3
The first-placed team in Division 4

League Phase

Division One

Play-Offs

Table

Division 2

Table

Division 3

Play-Offs

Table

Division 4

Table

Knockout phase

Quarter-finals

Semi-finals

Final

References

National Football League
National Football League
National Football League (Ireland) seasons